The Icelandic Women's Football League Cup (Icelandic: Deildarbikar kvenna), known as Lengjubikar kvenna for sponsorship reasons, is a pre-season professional football competition in Iceland. It is considered the third most important competition in Icelandic women's football.

The pre-season tournament involves the top 6 clubs in Iceland from the previous season of Úrvaldeild kvenna. It generally takes place between February and May.

Format 
The 6 teams are placed in one group. Each team meets each other once during the pool stage. The final positions of the group are determined after these 5 games are played. The top four of the group automatically gain entry to the next stage in the competition.

From the semifinal round it is a purely knockout competition where ties take place over 1-leg only. If a tie is not decided in 90 minutes, penalty kicks are taken to decide the game.

Winners

Finals

See also 
 Icelandic Men's Football League Cup

References

External links 
 Standings on Official Site
 IcelandFootball.net - League cup results. 

Football cup competitions in Iceland
Iceland